A Diesel shunter is a diesel locomotive used for shunting or switching.  See:

 Diesel locomotive
 Switcher
 GWR diesel shunters
 LMS diesel shunters